Selleslagh Racing Team (SRT) is a Belgian racing team, currently competing in the GT4 European Series.

In the 2010 season the team competed under the Mad-Croc Racing banner, the result of a collaboration between SRT and DKR Engineering of Luxembourg. For 2011 the two teams split to form two separate entries into the championship.

In 2011 the team concluded the season with a win in the last race. After this they started working in the background.

In 2014 the team is back. They acquired a Corvette C6 GTE and entered the car in the 2014 International GT Open season and elsewhere also.

In 2018 the team enters 3 cars in the GT4 European series and the Belcar endurance. The 3 cars are Mercedes AMG GT4, numbers during the races are 30, 31 and 32.

References

External links
 
 

Belgian auto racing teams
FIA GT1 World Championship teams
FIA GT Championship teams
International GT Open teams